I Am Sport Futsal Club is a Thai Futsal club. It currently plays in the Thailand Futsal League.

Players

Current squad

External links 

 I Am Sport Club
 https://web.archive.org/web/20100108202310/http://www.orkut.com/Main#Profile?uid=13473911466065486689

Futsal clubs in Thailand
Futsal clubs established in 2002
2002 establishments in Thailand